The Stranger is a 1920 American short silent Western film featuring Hoot Gibson.

Cast
 Hoot Gibson
 Dorothy Woods

See also
 Hoot Gibson filmography

External links
 

1920 films
1920 Western (genre) films
1920 short films
American silent short films
American black-and-white films
Silent American Western (genre) films
1920s American films
1920s English-language films